Magna Britannia, being a concise topographical account of the several counties of Great Britain was a topographical and historical survey published by the antiquarians Daniel Lysons and his brother Samuel Lysons in several volumes between 1806 and 1822. It covers the counties of Bedfordshire, Berkshire, Buckinghamshire, Cambridgeshire, Cheshire, Cornwall, Cumberland, Derbyshire, and Devon. The work was curtailed in 1819 on Samuel Lysons' death.

Unlike other similar works published in the seventeenth and eighteenth centuries, Magna Britannia is of significant value to economists and social historians because the Lysons brothers included content on topics such as population, manufacture and commerce.  They were also far less preoccupied than many antiquarians with coats of arms and pedigrees, and did not overstate the grandeur of the counties, as local topographers were apt to do.

An earlier work under the same title had been compiled by Thomas Cox.

Volumes
Volume 1, Bedfordshire, Berkshire, and Buckinghamshire, 1806
Volume 2, Cambridgeshire and the County Palatine of Chester, 1810
Volume 3, Cornwall, London, 1814
Volume 4, Cumberland, 1816
Volume 5, Derbyshire, 1817
Volume 6, Devonshire, 1822

See also
William Camden's Britannia

References
Oxford Dictionary of National Biography: entries for Daniel and Samuel Lysons.

Notes

External links
 Digitised volumes at HathiTrust. Retrieved 13 March 2015.
Digitised volumes at Internet Archive. Retrieved 13 March 2015.
Digitised volumes of Magna Britannia at British History Online. Retrieved 13 March 2015.

Book series introduced in 1806
Reference works in the public domain
Books about England
1806 non-fiction books
Topography